The Beisfjord Bridge is a girder bridge in Narvik Municipality in Nordland county, Norway.  The concrete bridge crosses the Beisfjorden on the west side of the town of Narvik. The  bridge connects Ankenes, a residential area on the west side of Narvik, southwest of the fjord, to the city centre of Narvik and the majority of the population is on the northeastern side.  The bridge carries the European route E6 highway and it was completed in 1957.

See also
List of bridges in Norway
List of bridges

References

Narvik
Road bridges in Nordland
European route E6 in Norway
Roads within the Arctic Circle
Bridges completed in 1957